Kote or Kota is a town on NH 66 in Brahmavar taluk. On the way from Brahmavar to Kundapura.

References

Villages in Udupi district